Asia Royal Cardiac & Medical Care Centre is a private hospital located in No. 14, Baho Street, Sanchaung Township, Yangon, Myanmar.  The hospital is an eleven-story twin building which was opened on 18 March 2000.

References

Hospital buildings completed in 2000
Hospitals established in 2000
Hospitals in Yangon